Kemp Malone (March 14, 1889 in Minter City, Mississippi – October 13, 1971) was an American medievalist, etymologist, philologist, and specialist in Chaucer who was lecturer and then professor of English Literature at Johns Hopkins University from 1924 to 1956.

Life 
Born in an academic family, Kemp Malone graduated from Emory College as it then was in 1907, with the ambition of mastering all the languages that impinged upon the development of Middle English. He spent several years in Germany, Denmark and Iceland. When World War I broke out, he served two years in the United States Army and was discharged with the rank of captain.

Malone served as president of the Modern Language Association, and other philological associations and was etymology editor of the American College Dictionary, 1947. With Louise Pound and Arthur G. Kennedy, he founded the journal American Speech, "to present information about English in America in a form appealing to general readers". He resisted the views of Old English poetry as products of a purely oral tradition. He contended that we must look to poets' individual elaboration of traditional structures: "A given poet was reckoned worthy if he handled with skill the stuff of which, by convention, poems must be made".
     
His interests ranged from 10th-century manuscripts to the etymology of contemporary comic strip names. American speech, the English language, the historical Arthur (his suggestion was the Roman dux Lucius Artorius Castus), Cædmon and Beowulf (he edited a facsimile of the Thorkelin transcripts, 1951), Deor - all were subjects among his hundreds of publications. He edited and translated a large corpus of medieval poetry: Widsith from the Exeter Book (1936). A sample of his production is a 1941 published book about old English poems, that were transferred into modern English alliterative verse.  
 
Rare books from his library, donated 1971 to Emory University, are part of the Ancient and Medieval History (MARBL) collection, held at Robert W. Woodruff Library at Emory University Libraries. The Kemp Malone library content were fully registered under Call number Z997.M35.

His literary heritage (30 document boxes) were deposited in 1983 at Johns Hopkins University.

The historian and biographer Dumas Malone was his younger brother.

References

Further reading 
Norman E. Eliason: Kemp Malone: 14 March 1889–13 October 1971. American Speech, volume 44, no. 3 (fall, 1969), pp. 163–165 (JSTOR)
Richard Macksey: Obituary: Kemp Malone: 1889–1971. MLN, volume 6, no. 6, Comparative Literature (Dec., 1971), p. 760 (JSTOR)
Thomas Pyles: Kemp Malone. Language, volume 48, no. 2 (June, 1972), pp. 499–505 (JSTOR)
R. W. Zandvoort: In Memoriam Kemp Malone. English Studies 53 (1972), pp. 87–88
Albert C. Baugh,  Morton W. Bloomfield, Francis P. Magoun: Kemp Malone. Speculum 47 (1972), pp. 601–03.

External links
Sources for his bibliography
Kemp Malone at mswritersandmusicians.com
Stuart A. Rose Manuscript, Archives, and Rare Book Library, Emory University: Kemp Malone papers, 1910-1970

1889 births
1971 deaths
American medievalists
Johns Hopkins University faculty
Anglo-Saxon studies scholars
20th-century American historians
American male non-fiction writers
Arthurian scholars
People from Minter City, Mississippi
Fellows of the Medieval Academy of America
Linguistic Society of America presidents
20th-century American male writers
Presidents of the Modern Language Association